The Jakarta Kota–Manggarai railway, nicknamed the rainbow line, is an elevated, 15 km long railway line that connects  with . Given its central position in the city, it is one of the most important railways in Jakarta.

History
Originally there were two northern termini, each on a separate rail branch: one next to the former city hall at "Station Batavia Noord", and the other at "Kleine Boom" on the east side of the Sunda Kelapa harbor near current day Pasar Ikan. "Kleine Boom" was the location of a customs office, and therefore this terminus was primarily meant for foreign boat passengers.

Initially built as a standard gauge (which at the time referred to 1067 mm gauge) and single-track railway, the line gained a second track and was electrified in the early 1920s in a project to improve the entire Batavian railway network.

Between 1988 and 1992, the so far ground-level railway was reconstructed into an elevated railway after all, aimed at providing grade separation to avoid level crossing accidents with other traffic. The elevated stations were each colored differently, hence the "rainbow line" nickname.

Trains
Both intercity and local trains use the Jakarta Kota-Manggarai line. Intercity trains will typically only serve Gambir Station, while local commuter trains call at every station. The following is a list of scheduled trains on this route:

Intercity trains
 Argo Lawu to Solo Balapan, Central Java
 Argo Sindoro to Semarang Tawang, Central Java
 Bima to Surabaya Gubeng, East Java
 Sembrani to Surabaya Pasar Turi, East Java

KRL Jabodetabek commuter trains
  Bogor Line: Jakarta Kota-Depok(-Bogor)

See also
PT Kereta Api

References

3 ft 6 in gauge railways in Indonesia
Railway lines in Indonesia